In Lebanon, the area codes are, including the leading 0, two, three or four

Dialling 
National: xx-xxx-xxx
International: +961-xx-xxx-xxx

Area codes
01 : Beirut and its Metropolitan area
02 : No longer in use (was previously used to call Syria)
030 : Mobile operators - MIC2 (touch)
031 : Mobile operators - MIC1 (alfa)
032 : Mobile operators - MIC1 (alfa)
033 : Mobile operators - MIC1 (alfa)
034 : Mobile operators - MIC1 (alfa)
035 : Mobile operators - MIC1 (alfa)
036 : Mobile operators - MIC2 (touch)
037 : Mobile operators - MIC2 (touch)
038 : Mobile operators - MIC2 (touch)
039 : Mobile operators - MIC2 (touch)
04 : Mount Lebanon, Metn Caza
05 : Mount Lebanon, Baabda Caza + Aley Caza + Chouf Caza
06 : North Lebanon (includes Akkar)
07 : South Lebanon (This includes some towns on the southern part of Mount Lebanon)
070 0 : Mobile operators - MIC2 (touch)
070 1 : Mobile operators - MIC1 (alfa)
070 2 : Mobile operators - MIC1 (alfa)
070 3 : Mobile operators - MIC1 (alfa)
070 4 : Mobile operators - MIC1 (alfa)
070 5 : Mobile operators - MIC1 (alfa)
070 6 : Mobile operators - MIC (touch)
070 7 : Mobile operators - MIC2 (touch)
070 8 : Mobile operators - MIC2 (touch)
070 9 : Mobile operators - MIC2 (touch)
071 0 : Mobile operators - MIC1 (alfa)
071 1 : Mobile operators - MIC2 (touch)
071 2 : Mobile operators - MIC2 (touch)
071 3 : Mobile operators - MIC2 (touch)
071 4 : Mobile operators - MIC2 (touch)
071 5 : Mobile operators - MIC2 (touch)
071 6 : Mobile operators - MIC1 (alfa)
071 7 : Mobile operators - MIC1 (alfa)
071 8 : Mobile operators - MIC1 (alfa)
071 9 : Mobile operators - MIC1 (alfa)
076 0 : Mobile operators - MIC2 (touch)
076 1 : Mobile operators - MIC1 (alfa)
076 3 : Mobile operators - MIC1 (alfa)
076 4 : Mobile operators - MIC1 (alfa)
076 5 : Mobile operators - MIC1 (alfa
076 6 : Mobile operators - MIC2 (touch)
076 7 : Mobile operators - MIC2 (touch)
076 8 : Mobile operators - MIC2 (touch)
076 9 : Mobile operators - MIC2 (touch)
078 8 : Mobile operators - MIC2 (touch)
078 9 : Mobile operators - MIC2 (touch)
079 1 : Mobile operators - MIC1 (alfa)
079 2 : Mobile operators - MIC1 (alfa)
079 3 : Mobile operators - MIC1 (alfa)
08 : Bekaa and Baalbek-Hermel
081 2 : Mobile operators - MIC1 (alfa)
081 3 : Mobile operators - MIC1 (alfa)
081 4 : Mobile operators - MIC1 (alfa)
081 6 : Mobile operators - MIC2 (Touch)
081 7 : Mobile operators - MIC2 (Touch)
09 : Mount Lebanon, Kesrouan Caza + Byblos Caza
10: MMS (119)

References

ITU allocations list
The Telecommunications Regulatory Authority (TRA) 

Lebanon
Lebanon communications-related lists